The Afar–Somali clashes are territorial conflicts between the Afar and Somali Regions of Ethiopia. The current conflict which began in 2014, is centered around three special Kebeles inhabited by ethnic Somalis from the Issa Clan. These three special Kebeles include the Adaytu in Mille woreda, Undufo in Gewane woreda, and Gedamaytu in Amibara Woreda.

History
In 2014, the federal government, headed by the Ethiopian People’s Revolutionary Democratic Front (EPRDF), redrew the boundary between the two regions. As a result the Somali Region lost three villages to the Afar Region. Since then they have been trying to get the villages back under their control.

According to Crisis Group since the conflicts began between the groups dozens of lives have been claimed. In October 2020, 27 people were killed. On 2 April 2021, 100 cattle herders were reportedly shot dead.

On 24 July 2021, clashes erupted in the town of Garbaiisa. The clashes, killing 300, were followed by massive protests in the Somali region, with roadblocks put on the only road out of the settlement and the partial destruction of the rail line that goes into Djibouti where 95% of Ethiopia's maritime trade goes through.

The conflict has spilled over to Djibouti where Afars and Somalis clashed in the Balbala suburb of Djibouti city. As a result, on 1 August the American embassy in Djibouti issued a demonstration alert warning of riots in Djibouti city's Balbala and Arhiba areas.

On 15 May 2022, both regions agreed to withdraw their forces from the disputed territory and support the return of displaced people. However, on 9 November the same year, at least 18 people were killed and around 28 others were injured in Dheymeed woreda, Sitti Zone.

See also
Afar Region
Somali Region

References

Ethiopian civil conflict (2018–present)
Conflicts in 2022
Riots and civil disorder in Ethiopia
Violence in Ethiopia
Conflicts in 2021